O19 or O-19 may refer to:
 Kneeland Airport, in by Humboldt County, California, United States
 , of the Royal Netherlands Navy
 , a submarine of the Royal Netherlands Navy
 Oxygen-19, an isotope of oxygen
 Thomas-Morse O-19, an observation aircraft of the United States Army Air Corps